Vampirella is a 1996 American direct-to-video superhero film which was part of the Roger Corman Presents series. It was based on the Vampirella comic book.

It was directed by Jim Wynorski, who said in 2013 that it was the one film of his he regretted making. "I can look back on it today and just say 'Oh well', but back when the memories were fresh and the blood on the floor was yet to dry, it was painful to even edit", he said. "What went wrong??? Wrong choice for the star, massive union problems in Vegas, studio interference, theft, accidents, 112 degree heat, you name it, we had it happen. But at least I got to see Soupy Sales perform."

Plot
30 centuries ago, on a distant planet called Drákulon, lies a civilized vampire society that drinks synthetic blood that flows through rivers across the planet. Harmony is interrupted when Vlad Tepish, a rebel vampire who prefers the traditional practice of sucking the blood of others, ends, along with his accomplices, with all the members of the council of elders who govern Drákulon and flees to Earth in order to create a race of vampires with their own ideals. Among the murdered elders was Ella's father, who, with a desire for revenge, decides to follow Vlad's trail to Earth.

During her journey, she is forced to stay on Mars for a while and, meanwhile, remains in a deep lethargy. A long time later, she is found by astronauts and is taken to Earth. Upon arrival, she immediately begins to do everything possible to reach Vlad, who is now in Las Vegas and pretends to be a singer named Jamie Blood. In her eagerness, she coincides with a special police unit responsible for trapping extraterrestrial beings that intend to damage the Earth.

At first Ella, who now calls herself Vampirella, intends to continue with her revenge plan, but then allies with the special unit and must fight against Vlad and his vampires to save humanity from being turned into a horde of vampires, although this implies that she violates her own principles of not drinking blood from other beings.

Cast
Talisa Soto as Vampirella/Ella
Roger Daltrey as Vlad Tepish
Richard Joseph Paul as Adam Van Helsing
Lee de Broux as Lieutenant Walsh
Brian Bloom as Demos
Corinna Harney as Sallah
Tom Deters as Traxx
Angus Scrimm as High Elder
David B. Katz as Forry Ackerman

Production

Development
A Vampirella film project had been in development for a number of years. Hammer Films was originally going to release the film in 1976 with actresses such as Caroline Munro and Valerie Leon being considered for the title role. Peter Cushing was also cast in the role as Pendragon as well as Orson Welles and Donald Pleasence in other roles, however the film was not made. Munro and fellow Hammer Horror actress Judy Matheson were featured in a 2019 film version of Vampirella starring Munro's daughter in the title role.
Hammer came close to making the film again in 1978 starring Barbara Leigh; Christopher Wicking wrote a script and John Hough was to direct. The film was going to be a co production with American International Pictures but then head of production Samuel Z. Arkoff decided not to make the film.

In the early 1980s Peter Guber and Jon Peters had the rights when they were at Polygram.

Film rights passed to Roger Corman and Jim Wynorski. Leigh says that Wynorski wanted to cast Paula Abdul in the title role. Wynorski had a friend, Gary Gerani, who was a Vampirella aficionado, and hired him to write the script.

Shooting
Jim Wynorski later called the film "a mess... a film I cannot watch. Everything went wrong. Everything!"

His main concern was the casting of Talisa Soto. Wynorski said, "She's very pretty and she's very sexy. But she's not Vampirella. They forced me to use her. She just didn't have the body for the costume....I should have had Julie Strain. But they didn't think Julie Strain meant anything. So they put somebody wrong in the role."

Wynorski later said he should "have stopped and said let's just not do this. But, I was going to lose the rights in six months, so I did what I had to do. At least, I got the film made. But I should have said no."

"It would have been so simple to cast the latest Baywatch bimbo in this part", said Gerani.  "So now she's a vampire wonder woman from outer space with a Puerto Rican accent. What more could you ask for?"

The director thought Roger Daltrey "was great... the actors were fine".

Filming took place in Las Vegas. "It was 110, everyday", said Wynorski. "Everybody was gambling, everybody was up all night. Everyone was blurry eyed. There was a thief on set who was stealing money. It was awful."

"When you see how lousy those bat transformations are", said Gerani, "you'll realize that we're just a hip little million-dollar drive-in movie."

"It was really a nasty, nasty picture to work on", said Wynorski. "And it came out badly, too... I wish I could go back now and redo it with the CGI of today. But even then, I just don't ever feel like going back to that.... It's got a good Joel Goldsmith score."

"Given how absurd anything called Vampirella would be, the movie certainly doesn't insult your intelligence", says Gerani. "I think there's a nice emotional depth to the piece."

Sequel announcement 
In the end credits of the film, a sequel was promised that would be titled Dark Avenger of Death; however, the sequel was never produced.

In 2021, Dynamite Entertainment announced a new feature film was in development, in addition to plans for television adaptations based on the Vampirella Universe.

References

External links

Vampirella at Letterbox DVD
Vampirella at Vampire Lore Website
Review of film at Moria
Review of film at Total Cults

1996 direct-to-video films
1996 films
Films produced by Roger Corman
Films scored by Joel Goldsmith
American direct-to-video films
American science fiction horror films
American superhero films
Alien visitations in films
American films about revenge
American vampire films
Superheroine films
Superhero horror films
American exploitation films
American action horror films
American science fiction action films
Films directed by Jim Wynorski
1990s English-language films
1990s American films